Avenida Caracas is an arterial road in Bogotá, Colombia that runs through the city from north to south.

Names 
The road has four names along its stretch: Avenida Caracas, Troncal Caracas, Carrera 14, and Carretera a Usme.

Route 
The road begins in the southern ward of Usme, where it is named Carretera a Usme. It runs north to Calle 70 Sur.

It continues north to the Portal de Usme, where it is known as the Troncal Caracas. It continues through the neighborhoods Ciudad Bolívar, Rafael Uribe Uribe, Antonio Nariño, Los Mártires, Santa Fe and Chapinero, until Calle 80 near the monument Los Héroes. It continues north to Chía with the name Autopista Norte.

Points of interest on the route 
 The TransMilenio stations Portal de Usme, Avenida Jiménez, and Tercer Milenio.
 Parque Tercer Milenio
 The headquarters of the Colombian National Police
 Downtown Bogotá
 Part of the commercial area Chapinero
 The Los Héroes monument

External links 

Streets in Bogotá